From Every Sphere is the second album by British singer-songwriter Ed Harcourt, released in 2003. Heavenly Records labelmate Jimi Goodwin of Doves plays tambourine on the first single "All of Your Days Will Be Blessed”, Harcourt’s only UK Top 40 single to date.

Track listing
 "Bittersweetheart" – 4:30
 "All of Your Days Will Be Blessed" – 3:43
 "Ghost Writer" – 4:18
 "The Birds Will Sing for Us" – 4:26
 "Sister Reneé" – 4:44
 "Undertaker Strut" – 3:41
 "Bleed a River Deep" – 4:48
 "Jetsetter" – 3:55
 "Watching the Sun Come Up" – 5:47
 "Fireflies Take Flight" – 4:35
 "Metaphorically Yours" – 4:49
 "From Every Sphere" – 7:27

Japan-only bonus tracks
 "The Ghosts Parade" – 5:30
 "Angels On Your Body" – 4:09

US-only bonus tracks
 "The Hammer and the Nail" – 5:20
 "Watching the Sun Come Up" (Enhanced Video)

Personnel

Musicians
 Ed Harcourt – vocals, piano, electric guitar, pump organ, drums, bass, Clavinet, bells, percussion, harmonica, slide guitar, acoustic guitar, glockenspiel, fun machine, Korg synthesizer, Omnichord
 Arnulf Lindner – electric bass, bowed bass, double bass, percussion
 Nick Yeatman – drums, percussion
 Hadrian Garrard – trumpet, trombone, Reed organ, percussion
 Leo Abrahams – electric guitar, acoustic guitar, piano, triggered strings, Casio, loops, slide guitar, sampling, string arrangements, woodwind arrangements, orchestral arrangements
 Jimi Goodwin – tambourine
 Lisa Germano – backing vocals, viola
 Claire Lewis – programming
 Tchad Blake – percussion
 Dominic Kelly – oboe
 Rowland Sutherland – flute
 Chris Richards – clarinet
 Jo Cackett – bassoon
 Matt Gunner – French horn

Wrecking Crew Orchestra
 Violin – Howard Gott, Ruth Gottlieb, Lucy Wilkins, Natalia Bonner, Tim Myall, Jackie Norrie, Sally Herbert, Wendy De St Paer, Anna Morris, Alison Blunt, Gillon Cameron, Claire Raybould, Louise Peacock
 Viola – Sophie Sirota, Rob Spriggs, Vince Greene, Amanda Drummond, Naomi Fairhurst
 Cello – Sarah Willson, Oli Kraus, Andy Nice, Chris Mansell

Singles
In the UK, there were two singles released:
"All of Your Days Will Be Blessed" (3 February 2003); CD
B-sides: "Coal Black Heart" / "Blackwoods Back Home" / "All of Your Days Will Be Blessed" (video)
"Watching the Sun Come Up" (19 May 2003); CD, Australian Tour EP CD
B-sides: "Sugarbomb" / "Paid to Get Drunk" / "Still I Dream of It" (Australian Tour EP only) / "Watching the Sun Come Up" (video)

References

2003 albums
Ed Harcourt albums
Heavenly Recordings albums
Albums produced by Tchad Blake